Emmanuel Stewart (born 23 August 1999) is a Grenadian cricketer. He made his List A debut for the West Indies Under-19s in the 2016–17 Regional Super50 on 25 January 2017. Prior to his List A debut, he was named in the West Indies squad for the 2016 Under-19 Cricket World Cup. In November 2017, he was named as the captain of the West Indies squad for the 2018 Under-19 Cricket World Cup.

He made his first-class debut for the Windward Islands in the 2018–19 Regional Four Day Competition on 7 March 2019. In October 2019, he was named in the Windward Islands' squad for the 2019–20 Regional Super50 tournament.

References

External links
 

1999 births
Living people
Grenadian cricketers
West Indies under-19 cricketers
Windward Islands cricketers
Place of birth missing (living people)
Wicket-keepers